Iruttu Araiyil Murattu Kuthu is a 2018 Indian Tamil-language adult horror comedy film written and directed by Santhosh P. Jayakumar and produced by K. E. Gnanavel Raja. The film stars Gautham Karthik and VJ Sha Ra, with Yashika Anand, Chandrika Ravi, and Vaibhavi Shandilya are in the female leads. The music was composed by Balamurali Balu with cinematography by Ballu and editing by Prasanna GK. The film was released on 4 May 2018.

The film was later remade in Telugu as Chikati Gadilo Chithakotudu by Jayakumar himself, while a spiritual sequel Irandam Kuththu was released in November 2020.

Plot 
Veera is a playboy who is rejected by every potential bride because of that reason. Thendral accepts his marriage proposal with one condition. She demands that he impress her and asks him to take her on a trip in order to know each other better. She also suggests him to bring along another couple. Veera informs his friend Vasu, who tells him that he has a girlfriend named Kavya, who is Veera's ex-girlfriend. When Kavya learns about Vasu's friendship with Veera, she vows to get her hands on him during the trip. The couple then travels to Thailand and rents a bungalow. Their host asks them not to go into a particular room in that bungalow.

One day, Veera and Vasu consume Viagra by accident, and when their girlfriends arrive earlier than expected, they run into the closed room to hide their arousal. There, they find a portrait of an under-dressed woman and masturbate, thereby arousing a ghost. The ghost begins to haunt them. She reveals that she died in an accident as a virgin and will have sex with a virgin to rest her soul. Since both of them are virgins, they are unable to leave the house. The ghost tries several attempts to have sex with Vasu and Veera but fails. They make fun of the ghost, but all their plans go in vain as she takes the form of a beautiful woman.

Since Veera and Vasu's wives know that the ghost is present, they call Jack and Rose, two conmen disguised as Father and nun, respectively. When Jack and Rose encounter the ghost, they too are trapped because they are virgins. For pacifying the ghost, they hire a cook named Babyshri. There, Babyshri falls in love with Jack. From somewhere, another virgin man named Girish Kalyan comes and gets trapped in the house. To execute the plan, they come up with a plan to have a party in which they invite boys and girls, hoping that one of them should be a virgin, but no one is. Veera thinks that his playboy nature is responsible for all this fiasco and decides to have sex with the ghost. Veera almost seduces the ghost, but in the process puts a fire boundary around the ghost on the advice of a Buddhist priest named Swamy. While Swamy controls the ghost, all the others (Veera-Thendral, Vasu-Kavya, Jack-Babyshri & Rose-Swamy's assistant) have sex and lose their virginities, which, in turn, results in the ghost getting killed. While taming the ghost, it is revealed that Swamy and Girish are homosexual men.

Cast

Production 
Following the success of the adult comedy Hara Hara Mahadevaki (2017), K. E. Gnanavel Raja chose to associate with director Santhosh P. Jayakumar and actor Gautham Karthik for another film in the same genre. Titled Iruttu Araiyil Murattu Kuththu, Santhosh stated it would be one of the first "adult horror comedy" films shot in the Tamil film industry. Production was briefly delayed due to the FEFSI strike in September 2017, but it duly began later that month. The makers initially attempted to cast Oviya in a lead role, following her rise to fame through the reality show Bigg Boss (2017), but she turned down the offer. Vaibhavi Shandilya was subsequently cast as the lead actress and began shooting for the film in Chennai for a five-day schedule. The team later moved to Thailand to shoot the rest of the film. Actresses Rashmi Gautham and Chandrika Ravi joined the team during the Thailand schedule, with Rashmi later replaced by Yaashika Aanand.

Soundtrack
The soundtrack was composed by Balamurali Balu in his second collaboration with actor Gautham Karthik and director Santhosh P. Jayakumar.

Release

Iruttu Araiyil Murattu Kuththu received mixed reviews and become commercial successful venture. Tamil Nadu theatrical rights of the film were sold for 5.25 crore.

Sequel

References

External links
 

2018 films
2010s Tamil-language films
2018 comedy horror films
Films shot in Chennai
Indian comedy horror films
Indian sex comedy films
2010s sex comedy films
Tamil films remade in other languages
Films scored by Balamurali Balu